This is a list of National Football League (NFL) players who have reached the 100-sack milestone.

The NFL began to keep track of sacks in 1982, with 41 players having reached the milestone in that time. Using unofficial record-keeping (dating back to 1960), an additional 21 players have finished with 100 or more career sacks, leading to a total of 62 players.

List of NFL players with 100 official career sacks

Updated through the  NFL season.

Unofficial sacks
In 2000, John Turney and Nick Webster, members of the Pro Football Researchers Association, conducted extensive research to create a more complete record of sacks in the NFL. After examining the play-by-play records of every NFL team as well as game film at NFL films they compiled a list of players with 100 sacks beginning in 1960. By including the unofficial sack/dump records from 1960 to 1981, the following players also qualify as members of the 100-Sack Club. 

Additionally, LBs Lawrence Taylor and Rickey Jackson played their rookie seasons in 1981, which was the last season that sacks were not officially tracked. Taylor had 9.5 and Jackson had 8.0 sacks that season, which would increase their totals to 142.0 and 136.0 sacks, respectively. These sacks would place Taylor at 9th and Jackson tied at 16th (with Jared Allen) on the unofficial sack list.

Updated through the  NFL season.

Active players nearing 100 career sacks
This list identifies active players with at least 90 career sacks. Updated through the  NFL season.

See also
 List of National Football League annual sacks leaders

References

Sac
National Football League lists
100 Sacks Club
Lists of National Football League players